Dragon Man may refer to:

 Zduhać (dragon man), a legendary creature in Balkan folklore
 Mel Bernstein, nicknamed "Dragon Man," an American firearms dealer
 Dragon Man, a species of archaic human, Homo longi, described in 2021
 Dragon Men (Tokyo), Shunjuku, Tokyo, Japan

Fiction
 Dragon Man (comics), a supervillain in the Marvel Comics Universe
 The Dragon Man, a 1999 crime novel
 Dragon men, a fictional species from Buck Rogers on the planet Mongo (fictional planet)

See also 

 Dragonborn (Dungeons & Dragons), a draconic humanoid species
 
 
 
 
 Dragon (disambiguation)
 Man (disambiguation)